The Michigan State Spartans field hockey team is the intercollegiate field hockey program representing Michigan State University. The school competes in the Big Ten Conference in Division I of the National Collegiate Athletic Association (NCAA). The Michigan State field hockey team plays its home games at the MSU Field Hockey Complex at Ralph Young Field on the university campus in East Lansing, Michigan. Since the field hockey program was established in 1972, the Spartans have won four Big Ten regular-season championships, four Big Ten tournament titles, and have appeared in the NCAA tournament nine times. The team is currently coached by Helen Knull.

History 

Field hockey has been a varsity sport at Michigan State University since 1972. The Spartans have competed as a member of the Big Ten Conference from 1981 to 1988 and again since 1992. From 1989 to 1991, Michigan State played in the Midwestern Collegiate Field Hockey Conference (MCFHC). Although the Spartans had never won a Big Ten championship (either in the regular-season or the tournament) or appeared in the NCAA tournament before 2001, they have found considerable success in the 21st century under the guidance of head coaches Michele Madison (1993–2005), Rolf van de Kerkhof (2006–10), and Helen Knull (2011–present). In the new millennium, Michigan State has won four Big Ten regular-season championships (2001, 2003, 2004, and 2009), four Big Ten tournament titles (2002, 2003, 2009, and 2013), and has qualified for the NCAA tournament nine times (2001, 2002, 2003, 2004, 2007, 2008, 2009, 2010, and 2013). The Spartans have advanced to the NCAA semifinals twice, in 2002 and 2004.

Head coaching records 

Head coaching records through the end of the 2014 season

Awards and accolades

Conference championships
Michigan State has won four regular-season conference titles, all in the Big Ten Conference.

All-Americans

Awards and accolades through the end of the 2014 season

Stadium 
Michigan State has played its home games at the MSU Field Hockey Complex at Ralph Young Field since September 2002. Ralph Young Field, which the field hockey program shares with the Spartan track and field team, was originally dedicated in April 1937 during a dual meet featuring Michigan State and the University of Chicago. At the turn of the 21st century, the university renovated the venue to enable it to host the field hockey team as well as its track and field counterpart. Located adjacent to Spartan Stadium, Ralph Young Field has a seating capacity of 1,500 and features an AstroTurf 12 playing surface. Its press box has a roof-mounted camera platform as well as seating for members of the media. Ralph Young Field also has permanent lighting that enables the Spartan field hockey team to play night games.

See also
List of NCAA Division I field hockey programs

References

External links